Cleopatra's Needle in London is one of a pair of obelisks, together named Cleopatra's Needles, that were relocated from the ruins of the Caesareum of Alexandria in the 19th century. Inscribed by Thutmose III and later Ramesses II of the Egyptian New Kingdom, the obelisk was moved to Alexandria in 12 BC, where it remained for nearly two millennia.

The obelisk was presented to the United Kingdom in 1819 by the ruler of Egypt and Sudan Muhammad Ali, in commemoration of the victories of Lord Nelson at the Battle of the Nile and Sir Ralph Abercromby at the Battle of Alexandria in 1801. Although the British government welcomed the gesture, it declined to fund the expense of transporting it to London. It was subsequently erected on the Victoria Embankment in Westminster, in 1878.

History

The obelisk was originally erected in the Egyptian city of Heliopolis on the orders of Thutmose III, around 1450 BC. It is of granite, brought from the quarries of Aswan, near the first cataract of the Nile. Thutmose III had a single column of text carved on each face, these were translated by E. A. Wallis Budge. Other inscriptions were added about 200 years later by Ramesses II to commemorate his military victories: these are in two columns on each face, flanking the original inscriptions. The obelisks were moved to Alexandria and set up in the Caesareum, a temple built by Cleopatra in honour of Mark Antony or Julius Caesar  by the Romans in 12 BC, during the reign of Augustus, but were toppled some time later. This had the fortuitous effect of burying their faces and so preserving most of the hieroglyphs from the effects of weathering.

Transport from Alexandria
The obelisk remained in Alexandria until 1877 when Sir William James Erasmus Wilson, a distinguished anatomist and dermatologist, sponsored its transportation to London from Alexandria at a cost of some £10,000 (equivalent to over £1,000,000 in 2020). This was designed by the engineer John Dixon (from original plans drawn up for Wilson by Mathew William Simpson, who was unable to undertake the work due to being under contract to the Khedive), and dubbed Cleopatra, to be commanded by Captain Carter. It was built at the Thames Iron Works, shipped to Alexandria in separate pieces, and built around the obelisk by Waynman Dixon, John's brother. It had a vertical stem and stern, a rudder, two bilge keels, a mast for balancing sails, and a deck house. This acted as a floating pontoon which was to be towed to London by the ship Olga, commanded by Captain Booth.

The effort almost met with disaster on 14 October 1877, in a storm in the Bay of Biscay, when the Cleopatra began wildly rolling, and became uncontrollable. The Olga sent out a rescue boat with six volunteers, but the boat capsized and all six crew were lost – they are named on a bronze plaque attached to the foot of the needle's mounting stone. Captain Booth on the Olga eventually managed to get his ship next to the Cleopatra and rescued Captain Carter and the five crew members aboard Cleopatra. Captain Booth reported the Cleopatra "abandoned and sinking", but she stayed afloat, drifting in the Bay, until found four days later by Spanish trawler boats, and then rescued by the Glasgow steamer Fitzmaurice and taken to Ferrol in Spain for repairs. The Master of the Fitzmaurice lodged a salvage claim of £5,000 which had to be settled before departure from Ferrol, but it was negotiated down and settled for £2,000. The William Watkins Ltd paddle tug Anglia, under the command of Captain David Glue, was then commissioned to tow the Cleopatra back to the Thames. On their arrival in the estuary on 21 January 1878, the school children of Gravesend were given the day off. A wooden model of the obelisk had previously been placed outside the Houses of Parliament, but the location had been rejected, so the London needle was finally erected on the Victoria Embankment on 12 September 1878.

Erection 

The original master stone mason who worked on the granite foundation was Lambeth-born William Henry Gould (1822–1891).

On erection of the obelisk in 1878, a time capsule was concealed in the front part of the pedestal containing: a set of 12 photographs of the best-looking English women of the day, a box of hairpins, a box of cigars, several tobacco pipes, a set of imperial weights, a baby's bottle, some children's toys, a shilling razor, a hydraulic jack and some samples of the cable used in the erection, a  bronze model of the monument, a complete set of contemporary British coins, a rupee, a portrait of Queen Victoria, a history of the transport of the monument plans, written on vellum, a translation of the inscriptions, copies of the Bible in several languages, a copy of John 3:16 in 215 languages, a copy of Whitaker's Almanack, a Bradshaw Railway Guide, a map of London and copies of 10 daily newspapers.

Cleopatra's Needle is flanked by two faux-Egyptian sphinxes, designed by the English architect George John Vulliamy. The sphinxes are cast in bronze and bear hieroglyphic inscriptions that say netjer nefer men-kheper-re di ankh, which translates as "the good god, Thuthmosis III given life". These sphinxes appear to be looking at the Needle rather than guarding it, due to the sphinxes' improper or backwards installation. The Embankment has other Egyptian flourishes, such as buxom winged sphinxes on the armrests of benches. On 4 September 1917, during World War I, a bomb from a German air raid landed near the needle. In commemoration of this event, the damage remains unrepaired to this day and is clearly visible in the form of shrapnel holes and gouges on the right-hand sphinx. Restoration work was carried out in 2005.

See also
 List of Egyptian obelisks

References

External links
 

15th-century BC steles
Ancient Egyptian obelisks
Diplomatic gifts
Grade I listed buildings in the City of Westminster
Grade I listed monuments and memorials
Monuments and memorials in London
Obelisks in England
Outdoor sculptures in London
Thutmose III
Victoria Embankment
Cleopatra's Needles